Neitiskaite (or Neitiskati) is a village in the Swedish municipality Gällivare. Together with Bönträsk it lies next to lake Bönträsket.

Populated places in Norrbotten County